Deidson Araújo Maia, better known as Veloso (Montes Claros, 21 May 1983), is a Brazilian footballer who plays as a goalkeeper. Currently plays for XV de Piracicaba.

Biography
Born in Montes Claros, Minas Gerais state, Veloso started his career in São Paulo.

In April 2005, he signed a 4-month contract with Mogi Mirim for 2005 Campeonato Brasileiro Série C. He worked as backup keeper for Márcio Kessler.

In April 2006 he signed a 1-year extension. He also signed a 5-month deal in December 2005 and a 5-month deal in July 2005.

Alagoas 
After played for Corinthians Alagoano at 2007 Campeonato Alagoano, in April 2007, he extended his contract with club until the end of year 2008. He was immediately loaned to city rival CRB for 2007 Campeonato Brasileiro Série B. He was understudy of Ricardo Vilar in the first 3 Série B matches and Vilar was dropped in round 4. Since round 4 Veloso became the first choice ahead of Jeferson. In round 13, Veloso lost his starting place and Jeferson became the first choice. CRB signed Paulo Musse in August 2007 and soon became the first choice, made Veloso dropped to the third keeper.

In January 2008, Veloso returned to Corinthians Alagoano for 2008 Campeonato Alagoano and 2008 Copa do Brasil. In June 2008, he was loaned to another city rival, CSA for 2008 Campeonato Brasileiro Série C, as understudy of Gilberto. He played his only match in round 4 (20 July 2008) and CSA failed to enter the second stage.

In January 2009, he signed a new 5-month contract with Corinthians Alagoano. He finished as losing finalists of the first half of 2009 Campeonato Alagoano.

Distrito Federal
In May 2009, he signed a new 1-year contract with club and loaned to Gama for 2009 Campeonato Brasileiro Série C, as understudy of Alencar along with Robson.

In August 2009, Gama bought him outright but left for another Distrito Federal team Ceilandense for the state league second division.

Cascavel, Marcílio Dias and Mirassol
In January 2010, he was signed by Cascavel until the end of 2010 Campeonato Paranaense. In July 2010 he left for Marcílio Dias for 2010 Campeonato Brasileiro Série D. He was the understudy of Márcio Kessler in the first 2 matches, but as first choice in the rest of the matches, with youth products Alemão and then Edmar on the bench. The Santa Catarina side failed to qualify for the second stage.

In January 2011 he returned to the city of Cascavel in 5 months contract. In July, he signed a 1-year deal with Mirassol, replacing departed Fernando. He played all possible game for Mirassol in 2011 Campeonato Brasileiro Série D. The team finished as the losing quarter-finalists. However, on 4 January 2012 Fernando returned to Mirassol and Veloso became the backup.

Honours
Campeonato Brasiliense Segunda Divisão: 2009

References

External links
 CBF 
 
 Futpedia Profile 

Brazilian footballers
Mogi Mirim Esporte Clube players
Sport Club Corinthians Alagoano players
Clube de Regatas Brasil players
Centro Sportivo Alagoano players
Sociedade Esportiva do Gama players
Mirassol Futebol Clube players
Association football goalkeepers
People from Minas Gerais
1983 births
Living people
Sportspeople from Minas Gerais